The 2008–09 season was Villarreal Club de Fútbol's 86th season in existence and the club's 9th consecutive season in the top flight of Spanish football. In addition to the domestic league, Villarreal participated in this season's editions of the Copa del Rey and the UEFA Champions League. The season covered the period from 1 July 2008 to 30 June 2009.

Players

First-team squad

Out on loan

Competitions

Overall record

La Liga

League table

Results summary

Results by round

Matches

Copa del Rey

Round of 32

UEFA Champions League

Group stage

The group stage draw was held on 28 August 2008.

Knockout phase

Round of 16
The draw for the round of 16 was held on 19 December 2008.

Quarter-finals
The draw for the quarter-finals was held on 20 March 2009.

References

External links

Villarreal CF seasons
Villarreal